Li Peng (born 1955) is a male former international table tennis player from China.

Table tennis career
He won a gold medal at the 1975 World Table Tennis Championships  with Li Zhenshi, Liang Geliang, Lu Yuansheng and Xu Shaofa as part of the Chinese team.

See also
 List of table tennis players
 List of World Table Tennis Championships medalists

References

Chinese male table tennis players
Living people
1955 births
Table tennis players from Shenyang
World Table Tennis Championships medalists